Bruno Loureiro Barros (born 28 January 1985), commonly known as Café, is a Brazilian futsal player.

References

1985 births
Living people
Brazilian men's futsal players
Sporting CP futsal players
Foolad Mahan FSC players
Sportspeople from Rio de Janeiro (state)